Ismael N. Ahmed is an American government official and labor leader who is the designate to be a member of the National Endowment of the Arts in the Biden administration. Ahmed previously served as the director of the Michigan Department of Human Services from September 2007 to January 3, 2011. He was appointed by Governor Jennifer Granholm in September 2007. As director of the state’s second-largest agency, Ahmed oversaw 10,000 employees and managed a $4 billion-plus budget serving 1.5 million medical assistance cases and 1.2 million cash and food assistance cases.

Early life and education
Ismael Ahmed was born in Brooklyn in 1947. He is of Lebanese and Egyptian descent. He moved to Detroit with his family when he was six years old. After high school, he traveled to Vietnam and Korea. He later became active in the United Auto Workers union to put himself through the University of Michigan–Dearborn, where he earned a Bachelor of Arts degree in secondary education and sociology in 1977.

Career
After graduation, he began helping out his neighborhood and his community and in 1973, Ahmed co-founded the Arab Community Center for Economic and Social Services (ACCESS). He was appointed executive director in 1983 and was responsible for overall operations of the organization as well as the executive administration of the Arab American National Museum. The largest Arab-American human services organization in the United States, ACCESS has affiliates in 11 states and offers more than 90 programs with more than 900,000 client contacts annually.

For several years Ahmed has been hosting his own radio show, This Island Earth on WDET. He contributed a chapter on the Arab Worker’s Caucus in Detroit in Arabs in America: Myths and Realities, Abu-Laban and Zeadey eds. (AAUG Monograph Series #5: Medina University Press, 1975) and a chapter on Michigan Arab Americans in American Arabs and Political Participation, Strum, P. ed., (Woodrow Wilson International Center, 2006).

Biden administration
On June 23, 2021, Ahmed was nominated to serve as a member of the National Council on the Arts by President Joe Biden. He was confirmed by the entire Senate on December 18, 2021, by voice vote.

Personal life
Ahmed's son, Saladin Ahmed, is a fantasy author.

Awards
Ismael Ahmed has been honored with the Neal Shine Award for Exemplary Regional Leadership, which is given by the Detroit Free Press and Metropolitan Affairs Coalition. He has also received the Distinguished Leadership Award from the University of Michigan–Dearborn and the Diversity Business Leader award from the Arab American Chamber of Commerce.

Notes

External links
 Michigan Department of Human Services
 Arab Community Center for Economic and Social Services

1947 births
Living people
Biden administration personnel
National Endowment for the Arts
People from Brooklyn
University of Michigan–Dearborn alumni